Pacho is a municipality and town of Colombia in the department of Cundinamarca. The municipality borders San Cayetano, Villagómez and Topaipí in the north, Supatá and Subachoque in the south, Vergara and El Peñón in the west and in the east Zipaquirá, Tausa and Cogua.

Etymology 
In the times before the Spanish conquest of the Muisca, Pacho was called Guataque or Gotaque; Gua; "mountain", Tha; "strong" and Que; "elevated", so "strong elevated mountain". The modern name is also derived from Chibcha; Pa is "father" and chó is "good"; "good father".

History 
The area of Pacho before becoming part of the New Kingdom of Granada was inhabited by the Muisca where the area of Pacho formed the western boundary of the Muisca Confederation, bordering the Muzo in the northwest and the Panche or Colima in the west and southwest.

Modern Pacho was founded on August 25, 1604, by Lorencio de Terrones.

Economy 
Pacho was already an agricultural area in the times of the Muisca. Today the main agricultural products are coffee, oranges, strawberries, papayas, pineapples, bananas, plantains, potatoes, yuca and flowers. The town also as an important dairy farming industry.

Born in Pacho 
 Samuel Cabrera, former professional cyclist
José Gonzalo Rodríguez Gacha, drug lord, part of Medellin Cartel

Gallery

References

See also
Francisco Hélmer Herrera Buitrago, nicknamed Pacho

Municipalities of Cundinamarca Department
Populated places established in 1604
1604 establishments in the Spanish Empire
Muisca Confederation
Muysccubun